Vikas Kashalkar (born 16 July 1950) is an Indian classical vocalist, with training in the Gwalior, Jaipur and Agra gharanas.

References

20th-century Indian male classical singers
Living people
1950 births
Hindustani singers
Singers from Pune
Gwalior gharana
21st-century Indian male classical singers